Miandoab is a city in the Central District of Miandoab County, West Azerbaijan province, Iran, and serves as capital of the county. At the 2006 census, its population was 112,933 in 29,207 households. The following census in 2011 counted 123,081 people in 35,066 households. The latest census in 2016 showed a population of 134,425 people in 41,459 households.

Demographics
Miandoab is largely populated by Azerbaijanis.

Geography
The city of Miandoab is on the Zarriné-Rūd river and located in the center of the plain that slopes down to Lake Urmia.

The city is a transportation connection point between West Azerbaijan Province and East Azerbaijan Province.  Thus, the city has been a transportation crossroads between the two large provinces, and has attracted political and economic interest from local and international governments.

Miandoab County

The area of Miandoab County is 2694 square kilometers. Miandoab County is located between the Iranian counties of Bukan, Malekan, Mahabad, and Shahin Dezh.

References

Miandoab County

Populated places in West Azerbaijan Province

Populated places in Miandoab County

Cities in West Azerbaijan Province